Presidential elections were held in Uganda for the first time on 9 May 1996. The result was a victory for incumbent Yoweri Museveni, who received 74% of the vote. All candidates ran as independents, as political parties were banned at the time. Voter turnout was 73%.

Results

References

Uganda
President
Uganda
Presidential elections in Uganda
Non-partisan elections